Kurupung is a mining community in the Cuyuni-Mazaruni Region of Guyana, near the Pakaraima Mountains.

Kurupung has two airstrips (one at the top of the mountain and one at the bottom of the mountain) (Airport code KPG), a police station, a health unit, and a sub-office of the Elections Commission. Children attend school in other villages.

The Kurupung River is a famous gold mining location associated with the community.

References

Populated places in Cuyuni-Mazaruni
Mining communities in South America
Mining in Guyana